The Near Future is a Canadian short drama film, directed by Sophie Goyette and released in 2012. The film stars Patrice Berthomier as Robin, a pilot for a small Quebec airline who learns of his mother's death, but goes through his day emotionally ambivalent about the news due to their complicated relationship.

The film premiered at the Saguenay International Short Film Festival (Regard sur le court métrage au Saguenay) in March 2012. It was subsequently screened at the 2012 Toronto International Film Festival, and at the 2013 Sundance Film Festival.

The film was a Canadian Screen Award nominee for Best Live Action Short Drama at the 1st Canadian Screen Awards, and a Prix Jutra nominee for Best Short Film at the 15th Jutra Awards.

References

External links
 

2012 short films
2012 films
Films directed by Sophie Goyette
French-language Canadian films
Canadian drama short films
2010s Canadian films